Clive is a city in Dallas and Polk counties in the U.S. state of Iowa. As of the 2020 Census, the population was 18,601. It is part of the Des Moines–West Des Moines Metropolitan Statistical Area. Clive is known for its Greenbelt Park and trail system running through the community. Clive serves as the axis of the western Des Moines suburbs, between Urbandale, Waukee and West Des Moines along the major transportation corridors of I-35, I-80 and I-235. The City of Urbandale is to the north to northwest, the City of West Des Moines is to the southeast to southwest, the City of Waukee in Dallas County is to the west.

History

Clive was platted in 1882 but did not incorporate as a city until August 18, 1956. While the exact origin of the city's name is unknown, it is believed to have been named after Robert Clive.

In its early days, Clive was a coal mining town and a railroad shipping point along the St. Louis – Des Moines Northern Railway. The railroad depot, which dates back from 1882, has been restored while the neighboring Swanson House, dating back from 1911, serves as the headquarters for the Clive Historical Society.

After incorporation in 1956, Clive has served as a mostly residential suburb of Des Moines, and the city has grown in both land area and population since that time. Most of Clive's businesses are along 86th Street, Hickman Road (which forms most of the boundary with Urbandale), and University Avenue (which forms the boundary with West Des Moines). Clive has been part of the West Des Moines School District since 1962; the portion of Clive that is in Dallas County is part of the Waukee School District.

Geography

Demographics

2010 census
As of the census of 2010, there were 15,447 people, 5,754 households, and 4,321 families living in the city. The racial makeup of the city was 88.1% White, 2.2% African American, 0.2% Native American, 4.0% Asian, 3.4% from other races, and 2.1% from two or more races. Hispanic or Latino of any race were 7.5% of the population.

There were 5,754 households, of which 39.1% had children under the age of 18 living with them, 64.3% were married couples living together, 7.1% had a female householder with no husband present, 3.8% had a male householder with no wife present, and 24.9% were non-families. 19.0% of all households were made up of individuals, and 5.7% had someone living alone who was 65 years of age or older. The average household size was 2.68 and the average family size was 3.09.

The median age in the city was 37.9 years. 28.3% of residents were under the age of 18; 6% were between the ages of 18 and 24; 27.1% were from 25 to 44; 28.7% were from 45 to 64; and 10% were 65 years of age or older. The gender makeup of the city was 49.8% male and 50.2% female.

2000 census
As of the census of 2000, there were 12,855 people, 4,752 households, and 3,630 families living in the city. The racial makeup of the city was 93.05% White, 1.24% African American, 0.08% Native American, 2.88% Asian, 0.01% Pacific Islander, 1.25% from other races, and 1.49% from two or more races. Hispanic or Latino of any race were 2.59% of the population.

There were 4,752 households, out of which 41.9% had children under the age of 18 living with them, 68.9% were married couples living together, 5.5% had a female householder with no husband present, and 23.6% were non-families. 18.2% of all households were made up of individuals, and 2.8% had someone living alone who was 65 years of age or older. The average household size was 2.70 and the average family size was 3.12.

Age spread: 29.5% under the age of 18, 6.1% from 18 to 24, 32.9% from 25 to 44, 26.0% from 45 to 64, and 5.6% who were 65 years of age or older. The median age was 35 years. For every 100 females, there were 98.5 males. For every 100 females age 18 and over, there were 96.0 males.

The median income for a household in the city was $74,127, and the median income for a family was $90,863. Males had a median income of $59,444 versus $34,533 for females. The per capita income for the city was $40,053. About 1.6% of families and 3.5% of the population were below the poverty line, including 3.4% of those under age 18 and 1.6% of those age 65 or over.

Education

West Des Moines Community School District serves a section of Clive. Many of the youth in the Clive area attend the public elementary school, Clive Learning Academy, as a part of the West Des Moines Community School District. Some of the other children attend Crossroads Park Elementary and various private schools.

Notable people
Chris Broussard, sports commentator and analyst
Gene Maddox, Iowa state legislator and lawyer, served as mayor of Clive from 1977 until 1992.
Mick Thomson, Guitarist with Grammy Award-winning band Slipknot.
Nash Roe, Kids Baking Championship contestant - Season 11

See also

Clive Greenbelt Trail
Iowa Employer Benefits Study

References

External links

Official Clive City Website
Chamber of Commerce
Clive Historical Society

Cities in Iowa
Cities in Dallas County, Iowa
Cities in Polk County, Iowa
Populated places established in 1882
Des Moines metropolitan area
1882 establishments in Iowa